Sharon Lorencia Horgan (born 13 July 1970) is an Irish actress, writer, director, producer, and comedian. She is best known for creating and starring in the comedy series Pulling (2006–2009), Catastrophe (2015–2019), and Bad Sisters (2022–present). She also created the comedy series Divorce (2016–2019), Motherland (2016–present), and Shining Vale (2022–present).

Horgan has appeared in films, such as Valiant (2005), Imagine Me & You (2005), Death of a Superhero (2011), Man Up (2015), Game Night (2018), Military Wives (2019), Dating Amber (2020), Together (2021), Everybody's Talking About Jamie (2021), and The Unbearable Weight of Massive Talent (2022).

Horgan won the 2008 British Comedy Award for Best TV Actress for Pulling, while the show's 2009 hour-long final episode won the British Comedy Award for Best Comedy Drama. A seven-time BAFTA TV Award nominee, she won the 2016 BAFTA TV Award for Best Comedy Writer for Catastrophe (with Rob Delaney). Catastrophe was also nominated for Scripted Comedy in the 2020 BAFTA TV Awards and for the 2016 Primetime Emmy Award for Outstanding Writing for a Comedy Series. She has also won five Irish Film and Television Awards in both acting and writing for her work on Catastrophe. For her performance in Dating Amber, Horgan won an Irish Film and Television Award for Best Supporting Actress.

Early life
Horgan was born in Hackney, London, England. Her mother is Irish and her father is from New Zealand. When she was four years old, her parents moved the family to Bellewstown, County Meath, Ireland, to run a turkey farm.

One of five siblings, Horgan later used her childhood experiences for the semi-autobiographical short film The Week Before Christmas for Sky Arts 1. Horgan went to the Sacred Heart convent school in Drogheda.

Career

Early career
As a young actress struggling to make ends meet she took a series of odd-jobs. At the age of 27, Horgan started a degree in English and American Studies at Brunel University in west London, graduating in 2000. Around that time, Horgan met British writer Dennis Kelly, while they were both working in youth theatre, and they started writing together, producing material they then sent to the BBC, for which they won the BBC New Comedy Award in 2001 for Sketch Writing and Performance.

Acting
Horgan has appeared on stage, television and screen. Her first credited appearances on television were in The State We're In (2002) and Monkey Dust (2003), two sketch shows based on news and current affairs. She also contributed material to Monkey Dust. Her first named acting role on television was as Theresa O'Leary in Absolute Power (2003), a comedy set in the world of public relations and starring Stephen Fry. In 2005 she made her big-screen debut as Beth in Imagine Me & You, a British-American romantic comedy with Lena Headey directed by Ol Parker. She starred in two series of Pulling, which she also co-wrote with Dennis Kelly. She has a supporting role in The Unbearable Weight of Massive Talent opposite Nicolas Cage which was released in March 2022.

Horgan appeared as a guest booker in two series of Rob Brydon's Annually Retentive (2006–07), also on the BBC, a spoof comedy set behind the scenes of a chat show presented by Rob Brydon. She won a British Comedy Award in 2007 for Best Female Newcomer for her performance.

In 2010 Horgan appeared in The Increasingly Poor Decisions of Todd Margaret. The US/UK comedy series was written by David Cross, who also appeared as the title anti-hero, an incompetent American who takes a job leading the London sales team for an energy drink. She played Alice Bell, the café owner on whom he developed a crush.

In September 2011 she appeared in the world premiere of Saul Rubinek's play Terrible Advice at the Menier Chocolate Factory in London. The play was set in Los Angeles and she played Delila, one half of its two warring couples.

In June 2012 Horgan was part of the ensemble cast for the pilot episode of Psychobitches, shown as part of Sky Arts 1's Playhouse Presents strand. In the sketch show, famous women from history are psychoanalysed by Rebecca Front's therapist; she played the novelist Jane Austen in the pilot, and later characters included Eva Peron, Cleopatra, Boudicca and Carmen Miranda. Two series of Psychobitches followed; the first was shown in May 2013, and the second in November 2014. She is well known for her role in Catastrophe, alongside Rob Delaney, a show which they co-created for Channel 4 and Amazon. Horgan also appeared in 2020’s second series of Criminal UK, BBC’s The Borrowers (2011), Dead Boss (2012) and Channel 4’s Free Agents (2009) and Bad Sugar (2012). She stars in and executive produces Channel 4 comedy-drama series This Way Up (2019–present).

Horgan played a supporting role in the 2018 dark comedy film Game Night as Sarah, a newcomer to the group of friends unwittingly roped into the game. She also appeared in films Death of a Superhero (2011), Run and Jump (2013), Man Up (2015), with Simon Pegg, Military Wives (2019) with Kristen Scott Thomas, Dating Amber (2020), and BBC Two film Together (2021) alongside James McAvoy.

She has voiced characters in the films Valiant (2005) and the short film Miss Remarkable & Her Career (2010). In 2017, she provided the voices of Minerva Campbell (the long-lost mother of the protagonist, Finn the Human) in the Cartoon Network animated series Adventure Time, and Courtney Portnoy in the animated series Bojack Horseman. She voices Queen Dagmar in Matt Groening’s animated series Disenchantment, and Kathleen in the animated series Bob's Burgers. She voices a Russian ex show cat Tabitha in 2021’s Housebroken which she executive produced.

Horgan also appeared in the feature film adaptation of the West End musical Everybody’s Talking About Jamie as Miss Hedge, which was released in September 2021.

Writer
Horgan's career breakthrough was Pulling, which she co-wrote with Dennis Kelly and starred in. She played Donna, an irresponsible marketing manager who calls off her wedding at the last minute, and one of three women sharing a flat in Penge, south London. It was noted for its broad humour about sex and the consumption of alcohol. Pulling was first shown on BBC Three in 2006, then repeated on BBC Two in 2008. The six-episode series became a ‘sleeper hit’, which gained iconic status with fans and was lauded by critics. A second series of six episodes ran March–April 2008 on BBC Three.

Despite good ratings and critical plaudits, Pulling was cancelled after two series, although an hour-long final episode was broadcast in May 2009. In 2007, the show was nominated for a British Academy Television Award and Horgan was nominated for a British Comedy Award. In 2008 she won a British Comedy Award for Pulling. In 2009 she was nominated for a British Academy Television Award and the show won a British Comedy Award.

In 2007 Horgan wrote Angelo's directed by Chloe Thomas and in June 2012 Horgan starred in Dead Boss, a sitcom set in a prison, which she wrote with comic Holly Walsh.

From 2015-2019, she co-starred and co-wrote the sitcom Catastrophe with American comic Rob Delaney. The two first met on Twitter, and because they made each other laugh decided to work together. They have both said Catastrophe was broadly based on their own personal experiences. In it she played Sharon, an Irishwoman living in London who becomes pregnant by Rob, an American she meets while he is on a business trip to London. Carrie Fisher played his mother. It was an instant critical success and after the second episode of the six-part series was aired Channel 4 announced it had commissioned a second series. Horgan was twice nominated for a Best Female Comedy Performance BAFTA for her role. in 2016, Channel 4, ordered a third and fourth season.

She also wrote Divorce (2016-2019), a US comedy series starring Sarah Jessica Parker, who plays a New York woman going through a lengthy divorce. In April 2015, HBO announced it had picked up the series after the pilot episode, and the show is Parker's first major acting commitment since Sex and the City. She was also an executive producer.

Horgan wrote the short Dreamland, which won the 2018 BAFTA TV Award for Best Short Form Programme and an episode of Modern Love titled “Rallying to Keep the Game Alive” (2019), which she also directed. She also co-created and co-writes Motherland (2017–present) for BBC Two, a programme about navigating the trials and traumas of middle-class motherhood, looking at the competitive side and unromantic take on parenting - not the cute and acceptable public face of motherhood, which is now in its third series.

She co-created and executive produced Shining Vale, alongside Jeff Astrof: a horror-comedy series for Starz. Courteney Cox has been cast as the lead. She is also writing alongside Kate Folk on a half-hour dramedy in development with 20th Television for Hulu, which will be set in the world of technology and dating and is based on The New Yorker Magazine short story ‘Out There’ by Folk. All three of these projects are co-produced via Horgan and Clelia Mountford’s production company Merman.

Director
In December 2012 Horgan made her directorial debut with the semi-autobiographical film The Week Before Christmas, which was broadcast as part of the Little Crackers series of short films on Sky 1. It was set on a turkey farm in Ireland, and in it she played her own mother, while her father was played by actor Conleth Hill. She later directed an episode of Amazon’s anthology series Modern Love titled “Rallying to Keep the Game Alive” which starred Tina Fey and John Slattery.

Presenter
In February 2005 Horgan co-presented the first series of The Friday Night Project (later The Sunday Night Project), a comedy variety show on Channel 4. On 3 June 2011, Horgan was the guest host of Have I Got News for You on BBC1.

She has presented a series of documentaries for Channel 4. In January 2012, in How to Be a Good Mother she talked to several families about their approach to child-rearing. In January 2013 in Secrets of a Good Marriage she discovered how various couples make their relationships work; and in On the Verge of a Midlife Crisis, she spoke to six women who had coped with the experience.

Horgan appeared on the BBC Radio 4 show Chain Reaction in March and April 2015. One week she was interviewed by Olivia Colman and the following week she interviewed Dennis Kelly.

Production company
In 2014, Horgan established Merman, an independent production company, with Clelia Mountford, who produced A Young Doctor's Notebook, Mr. Sloane, and Cockroaches.  The two women met while working on The Week Before Christmas. The company now has offices in London, New York and LA.

Merman has co-produced many shows including Divorce (2016-2019), an American comedy series starring Sarah Jessica Parker, who plays a New York woman going through a lengthy divorce, Horgan also created the series. Merman produced the third series of The Increasingly Poor Decisions of Todd Margaret, which aired in early 2016. Merman also co-produced the critically acclaimed Catastrophe (2015-2019), BBC comedy Motherland, and W / RTÉ2’s Women on the Verge.

Merman also makes Sky and ABC’s Frayed (2019-present) created by comedian Sarah Kendall, which tells the story of wealthy London housewife is forced to return to her hometown in Australia, where she's forced to confront her past and the reasons that caused her to leave years ago. It is a co-production with Guesswork Television. Merman has also created BBC and Britbox’s There She Goes (2018-present) which centres around Rosie, a severely learning-disabled girl and her family. For Channel 4 and Hulu, Merman produces the BAFTA winning This Way Up (2019-present), a comedy about moving on, moving forward and trying to find happiness. Áine, played by writer Aisling Bea, is a whip smart English-as-a-foreign language (TEFL) teacher trying to pull her life back together after a “teeny little nervous breakdown”. Her sister Shona, is played by Horgan. Merman also produces Channel 4 and Amazon’s Frank of Ireland (2021–present), created by Domhnall and Brian Gleeson, the hilarious story of a man’s hapless search for respect.

Merman has also co-produced its first feature, Herself (2021) alongside Element Pictures, a female-fronted film that follows a broken family’s journey to find a home set during the Irish housing crisis. Herself had its debut at Sundance in January 2020, was selected for the London Film Festival in October 2020 and was released in Irish & UK cinemas from 10 September 2021. It is available to stream in the US on Amazon. Merman co-produces 2021’s animated comedy Housebroken for Fox co-created with Clea Duvall, Jennifer Crittenden and Gabrielle Allan.

Merman has recently announced their Starz horror-comedy series Shining Vale, starring Courteney Cox, Greg Kinnear and Mira Sorvino.

The company has won and been nominated for a whole host of awards, including film Herself longlisted for Outstanding British Film at the 2021 BAFTA Film Awards, There She Goes winning Best Returning Comedy-Drama Series at the 2020 C21 International Drama Awards and a Female Performance in a Comedy award at the 2019 BAFTA TV Awards. Frayed was nominated for five 2019 Australian Academy of Cinema and Television Arts Awards. Merman was nominated for Multichannel Production Company of the Year at the 2020 Broadcast Digital Awards and Production Company of the Year at the 2019 Edinburgh TV Awards.

Personal life
Horgan married businessman Jeremy Rainbird on 16 October 2005. The couple lived in London, with their two daughters. They divorced in 2019.

Her younger brother Shane is a former international rugby union player who played wing or centre for Leinster and Ireland, and is now a rugby analyst for RTÉ Sports. Her other younger brother is Mark Horgan of Second Captains and creator of acclaimed podcast Where is George Gibney?

Filmography

Film

Television

Radio

Theatre

Awards and nominations

References

External links

Facebook fan page

Living people
1970 births
21st-century Irish actresses
21st-century Irish screenwriters
21st-century Irish women writers
Actors from County Meath
Irish comedy writers
Irish film actresses
Irish people of New Zealand descent
Irish television actresses
Irish television producers
Irish television writers
Irish women comedians
People from Hackney Central
Irish women television producers
Women television writers
21st-century Irish comedians
Actresses from London
Writers from London
Irish sketch comedians